is an arcade shooter game developed and released in 1983 by Tehkan (now known as Tecmo). The title, the Japanese word for "battlefield", is written in the kunrei-shiki romanization style. In the Hepburn style, it would be written as "Senjō".

Gameplay 
The gameplay involves the player controlling a fixed turret on a tank shooting oncoming alien enemies through a cross-hair target. A certain number of enemies must be destroyed to progress to the next stage. The original arcade cabinet was a cocktail table.

The game employs the use of pseudo-3D graphical effects to give the illusion of a three-dimensional landscape. However, the player's tank is fixed in a single location, whereas the enemies can move across the landscape.

Release 
The arcade game was released in Japan in 1983. In North America, it was demonstrated at AMOA 1984.

The game was ported and published by Sony Corporation in 1984 for MSX computers.

In 2005, Senjyo was re-released exclusively on the Xbox, as part of the Tecmo Classic Arcade collection.

Reception 
In Japan, Game Machine listed Senjyo on their January 1, 1984 issue as being the second most-successful new table arcade unit of the month.

Zelmo of Video Games magazine reviewed the arcade game following its AMOA 1984 demonstration, comparing the gameplay favorably with the 1983 Atari 2600 games Battlezone and Robot Tank while praising the "very nice" graphics, effects and "three-dimensional" landscape. However, the reviewer said the player's "restricted movement" compared to "the maneuverability of the various enemies" made it "frustrating" and could limit the game's arcade audience, concluding that, for "the home this effort would have some promise, but as an arcade game it might be just a little off base."

References

External links
GameFaqs
Coinop.org
Games Database

1983 video games
Arcade video games
Fixed shooters
MSX games
Nintendo Switch games
PlayStation 4 games
Tecmo games
Video games developed in Japan
Hamster Corporation games